Qiniyeh is a village in the Sinjar District, southern of the Sinjar Mountains in the Nineveh Governorate in  Iraq. It is populated by Yazidis and gained international fame in 2014 through the genocide of the Islamic State on the Yazidis.

History 
On 3 August 2014, about 90 Yazidis (including 12-year-old boys) were shot dead by ISIS terrorists in Qiniyeh. These Yazidis were traveling in a group of at least 300 other Yazidis who wanted to flee to the mountains in front of the IS terrorists. Also in the nearby village of Kojo on 15 August 2014 over 600 Yazidis were killed by ISIS terrorists.

See also 
 Kocho
 List of Yazidi settlements
 Sinjar
 Genocide of Yazidis by ISIL

References 

Populated places in Nineveh Governorate
Yazidi populated places in Iraq